PUSD may refer to:

Organisations
United Social Democratic Party (Partido Unido Social Democrático), a political party in Guinea-Bissau

School districts

Arizona
 Page Unified School District
 Parker Unified School District
 Payson Unified School District
 Peoria Unified School District
 Pima Unified School District
 Piñon Unified School District
 Prescott Unified School District

California
 Paramount Unified School District
 Pasadena Unified School District 
 Piedmont Unified School District 
 Pittsburg Unified School District
 Pleasanton Unified School District
 Plumas Unified School District
 Pomona Unified School District
 Porterville Unified School District
 Poway Unified School District